Sa-Deuce is the self-titled first and only album by R&B group, Sa-Deuce. It was released on March 26, 1996 through East West Records. The album peaked 79 on the Top R&B/Hip-Hop Albums, and the album's lead single "Don't Waste My Time" peaked at 42 on the Hot R&B/Hip-Hop Singles & Tracks chart.

Track listing
"Can't Get You Off My Mind"   
"Don't Waste My Time"   
"Just Can't Live Without Your Love"   
"Don't Take Your Love Away"   
"Go Down"   
"Ordinary People" (featuring Michael Speaks)   
"Born In"   
"One Man Woman"   
"Body Knockin'"   
"Full Time Lover" 
"Does She"

References

1996 debut albums
East West Records albums